Club Unión Atlético Maracaibo (usually called Maracaibo) was a professional club founded in 2001 and the club had one First Division title in the professional era. The club was based in Maracaibo.

Titles

National
Primera División Venezolana: 1
Winners (1): 2004-05
Runner-up (3): 2002-03, 2005-06, 2006-07

Performance in CONMEBOL competitions
Copa Libertadores: 4 appearances
2004: 2nd Group Stage, lost playoff round
2006: Group Stage
2007: Group Stage
2008: Group Stage

Copa Sudamericana: 1 appearance
2008: First Round

External links
 Sitio Web Oficial
 Sitio Web No Oficial

 
Football clubs in Venezuela
Association football clubs established in 2001
2001 establishments in Venezuela
Defunct football clubs in Venezuela
Sport in Maracaibo